The 2008 ICC Awards were held on 10 September 2008 in Dubai, United Arab Emirates. Previous events were held in London (2004), Sydney (2005), Mumbai (2006) and Johannesburg (2007). The ICC had been hosting ICC Awards since 2004 and was into its fifth year. They were presented in association with the Federation of International Cricketers' Associations (FICA) and honours for the Twenty20 International Performance of the Year were also awarded for the first time. The ICC awards the Sir Garfield Sobers Trophy to the Cricketer of the Year, which is considered to be the most prestigious award in world cricket.

Selection Committee
Nominees were voted on by a 25-person panel of current and ex-players and officials from among players chosen by the ICC Selection Committee, chaired by ICC Cricket Hall of Famer Clive Lloyd.

Selection Committee members:

 Clive Lloyd (chairman)
 Greg Chappell
 Shaun Pollock
 Sidath Wettimuny
 Athar Ali Khan

Award categories and winners

Cricketer of the Year

 Shivnarine Chanderpaul

Test Player of the Year

 Dale Steyn

ODI Player of the Year

 MS Dhoni

Twenty20 International Performance of the Year
 Yuvraj Singh, for scoring 58 runs off 16 deliveries against England at the 2007 ICC World Twenty20 in South Africa on 19 September 2007

Emerging Player of the Year

 Ajantha Mendis

Associate Player of the Year
 Ryan ten Doeschate

Umpire of the Year

 Simon Taufel

Women's Cricketer of the Year

 Charlotte Edwards

Spirit of Cricket

ICC World XI Teams

ICC Test Team of the Year

Graeme Smith was selected as the captain of the Test Team of the Year. In addition to a wicket-keeper, 9 other players and a 12th man were announced as follows:

 Graeme Smith
 Virender Sehwag
 Mahela Jayawardene
 Shivnarine Chanderpaul
 Kevin Pietersen
 Jacques Kallis
 Kumar Sangakkara (wicket-keeper)
 Brett Lee
 Ryan Sidebottom
 Dale Steyn
 Muttiah Muralitharan
 Stuart Clark (12th man)

ICC ODI Team of the Year

Ricky Ponting was selected as the captain of the ODI Team of the Year. In addition to a wicket-keeper, 9 other players and a 12th man were announced as follows:

 Herschelle Gibbs
 Sachin Tendulkar
 Ricky Ponting
 Younis Khan
 Andrew Symonds
 MS Dhoni (wicket-keeper)
 Farveez Maharoof
 Daniel Vettori
 Brett Lee
 Mitchell Johnson
 Nathan Bracken
 Salman Butt (12th man)

Short lists

Cricketer of the Year
 Shivnarine Chanderpaul
 Mahela Jayawardene
 Graeme Smith
 Dale Steyn

Test Player of the Year
 Shivnarine Chanderpaul
 Mahela Jayawardene
 Jacques Kallis
 Dale Steyn

ODI Player of the Year
 Nathan Bracken
 MS Dhoni
 Sachin Tendulkar
 Mohammad Yousuf

Twenty20 International Performance of the Year
 Chris Gayle
 MS Dhoni
 Brett Lee
 Yuvraj Singh

Emerging Player of the Year
 Stuart Broad
 Ajantha Mendis
 Morné Morkel
 Ishant Sharma

Associate Player of the Year
 Ryan ten Doeschate
 Niall O'Brien
 Alex Obanda
 Thomas Odoyo

Umpire of the Year
 Mark Benson
 Aleem Dar
 Steve Davis
 Rudi Koertzen
 Simon Taufel

Women's Cricketer of the Year
 Nicola Browne
 Charlotte Edwards
 Lisa Sthalekar
 Claire Taylor

Spirit of Cricket

 Sri Lanka

See also

 International Cricket Council
 ICC Awards
 Sir Garfield Sobers Trophy (Cricketer of the Year)
 ICC Test Player of the Year
 ICC ODI Player of the Year
 David Shepherd Trophy (Umpire of the Year)
 ICC Women's Cricketer of the Year
 ICC Test Team of the Year
 ICC ODI Team of the Year

References

International Cricket Council awards and rankings
Crick
ICC Awards